Cestrotus is a genus of brachyceran flies in the family Lauxaniidae.

Species
C. acuticurvus Li, Yang and Gaimari, 2009
C. apicalis (Hendel, 1920)
C. argenteus Hendel, 1920
C. cutherbertsoni Curran, 1938
C. elegans Hendel, 1920
C. flavipes (Frey, 1927)
C. flavoscutellatus de Meijere, 1910
C. frontalis (Kertész, 1904)
C. hennigi (Lindner, 1956)
C. heteropterus Li, Yang and Gaimari, 2009
C. liui Li, Yang and Gaimari, 2009
C. longinudus Li, Yang and Gaimari, 2009
C. megacephalus Loew, 1862
C. obtusus Li, Yang and Gaimari, 2009
C. oculatus Hendel, 1910
C. pictipennis (Wiedemann, 1824)
C. pilosus (Hendel, 1920)
C. polygrammus (Walker, 1861)
C. striatus Hendel, 1910
C. tibialis Bezzi, 1908
C. trivittatus Sasakawa, 2003
C. turritus Loew, 1862
C. univittatus Sasakawa, 2003
C. variegatus Loew, 1862

References

External links 
 
 
 

Lauxaniidae
Schizophora genera
Taxa named by Hermann Loew